Thompsonville, Texas may refer to the following places:
Thompsonville, Gonzales County, Texas
Thompsonville, Jim Hogg County, Texas